Jacu-Pêssego is a future monorail station of São Paulo Metro. It will serve Line 15-Silver, which connects the nearby neighbourhood to the Metro Line 2-Green in Vila Prudente. It will be located at Avenida Ragueb Chohfi, 4383, next to a junction with Avenida Jacu-Pêssego.

The station is the last of the  expansion pack of this line.

Station layout

References

São Paulo Metro stations
Proposed railway stations in Brazil
Railway stations scheduled to open in 2025